Ceratostoma, common name  the "hornmouth" snails, is a genus of medium to large predatory sea snails,  marine gastropod mollusks in the family Muricidae, the rock snails. 

This genus should not be confused with the nudibranch genus Ceratosoma, meaning "thorn body". Ceratostoma means "thorn mouth" because of the thorn-like projection on the edge of the aperture, used as a tool in predation to prop open the shells of bivalves and barnacles.

Species
Species within the genus Ceratostoma include:
 Ceratostoma burnetti  (Adams & Reeve, 1849)
 Ceratostoma foliatum  (Gmelin, 1791)
 Ceratostoma fournieri  (Crosse, 1861)
 Ceratostoma monoceros  (G. B. Sowerby II, 1841)
 Ceratostoma nuttalli  Conrad, 1837
 Ceratostoma rorifluum  (Adams & Reeve, 1849)

Species brought into synonymy:
 Ceratostoma inornatum (Récluz, 1851) accepted as Pteropurpura (Ocinebrellus) inornata (Récluz, 1851) accepted as Ocenebra inornata (Récluz, 1851)
 Ceratostoma varicosum (Kuroda, 1953) accepted as Genkaimurex varicosus (Kuroda, 1953)

References

 WoRMS listing

External links
 Herrmannsen, A. N. (1846-1852). Indicis Generum Malacozoorum primordia. Fischer, Cassel. Vol. 1: i-xxviii, 1-637 pp

Muricidae